Shelomith of Dibri is the only woman named in the Book of Leviticus in the Bible. Her story is found in Leviticus 24:10-23. The focus of the passage is on Shelomith's son who committed blasphemy and was stoned to death.

Shelomith in biblical narrative 
Leviticus 24:10-23 tells the story of a certain man, whose name is not given. He was the son of an Israelite mother, Shelomith, daughter of Dibri of the tribe of Dan. He had an Egyptian father who is not given a name (v. 10). Shelomith's son, in the course of a quarrel with another Israelite, blasphemed, using the Divine Name. As a result, the Israelites brought him to Moses and he was held in custody until a decision could be made (v. 12). Leviticus states that the Lord instructed Moses that he should be stoned. Therefore, Shelomith's son was stoned to death by the Israelites.

Interpretation 
In Wilda Gafney's book Womanist Midrash: A Reintroduction to the Women of the Torah and the Throne Shelomith is one featured woman. Gafney presents Shelomith’s story from a womanist point of view. Gafney describes Shelomith's identity as a woman from the tribe of Dan, the only woman named in the book of Leviticus, a mother, and a possible victim. Gafney writes, "Shelomith is the mother of a child who was accused - rightly or wrongly - of a crime, imprisonment, and executed." This interpretation leads Gafney to connect Shelomith with women of color in the United States, especially mothers of children of color who have found themselves in the criminal justice system.

References 

Book of Leviticus
Women in the Hebrew Bible